Marcelo Melo and André Sá were the defending champions, but lost in the first round to Thomaz Bellucci and Sebastián Prieto.

In the final, Marcel Granollers and Tommy Robredo defeated Lucas Arnold Ker and Juan Mónaco, 6–4, 7–5.

Seeds

Draw

Draw

External links
Draw

Doubles